See adhesive for general discussion of glue.

This is a list of various types of glue. Historically, the term "glue" only referred to protein colloids prepared from animal flesh. The meaning has been extended to refer to any fluid adhesive.

There are many adhesive substances that are considered or commonly referred to as "glue".

Plant- and animal-based adhesives

Solvent-type glues

Solvent adhesives temporarily dissolve the substance they are gluing, and bond by solvent-welding material together with the re-solidified material.

Synthetic glues

Synthetic monomer glues

Synthetic polymer glues

Thermoplastic polymers

Thermoplastic glues including hot-melt adhesives cure reversibly as they cool, like the gelatin and keratin glues listed above. They frequently don't emit volatiles unless overheated.

 Styrene acrylic copolymer – e.g. "No More Nails"

Thermosetting polymers

Thermosetting glues or thermosets cure irreversibly by polymerization. The polymerization can be triggered by heat or other radiation, or high pressure or a catalyst/hardener may be added.

 Epoxy resins
 Epoxy putty
 Polyvinyls
 Polyvinyl acetate (PVA) Includes white glue (e.g. Elmer's Glue) and yellow carpenter's glue (Aliphatic resin) (Brands include Titebond and Lepage)
 Polyvinyl alcohol
 Polyvinyl chloride (PVC)
 Polyvinyl chloride emulsion (PVCE) – a water-miscible emulsion that polymerizes as it cures
 Polyvinylpyrrolidone (component of glue sticks)
 Silicone resins
 Silyl modified polymers

By use
 Postage stamp gum may be a mixture of assorted starch and resin adhesives
 Library paste is usually starch-based
 Meat glue is a variety of culinary binding agents

References

 

es:Pegamento
nl:Lijst van lijmsoorten
pt:Cola (desambiguação)